Alikhel or Alikhil is a Pashtun tribe in Afghanistan, Pakistan, and India. Alikhel belongs to the tribe of the Panni confederation of Pashtuns.  It is considered a "brother tribe" of the Sulaimankhel and Tanoli tribes.

In 1924, the Alikhel joined in the Khost Rebellion initiated by the Mangal tribe.

Notable members 
Abassin Alikhil
Ikram Alikhil
Selsela Alikhil

See also 
 Ali Khel, Orakzai Agency, Pakistan
 Ali Khel, Jalandhar, Punjab, India
 Ali Khel, a district in Ghazni, Afghanistan
 Ali Khel, Waziristan, a town in Federally Administered Tribal Areas, Pakistan
 Ali Khel, a town in Balochistan, Pakistan
 Ali Khel, Malakand, Swat KPK, Pakistan
 Ali Khel, Paktia, Afghanistan
 Ali Khel, district of Laghman, Afghanistan
 Ali Khel, Azakhel Bala, Nowshera of KPK province of Pakistan
 Ali Khel, Dushi District, Baghlan of Afghanistan

References

External links 
 Pakhtun Tribes

Ghilji Pashtun tribes
Pashto-language surnames
Pakistani names